The 1916 Chicago White Sox finished second in the American League, just two games behind the first-place Boston Red Sox. By this time, the nucleus of the 1917–19 dynasty was in place. Chicago would win the World Series the following season.

Regular season 
This was Shoeless Joe Jackson's first full season with the White Sox. He led the team in batting with a .341 average and finished third in the league overall. Eddie Collins and Happy Felsch also hit .300. The pitching staff was well-balanced, with seven men making at least 14 starts.

Season standings

Record vs. opponents

Roster

Player stats

Batting

Starters by position 
Note: Pos = Position; G = Games played; AB = At bats; H = Hits; Avg. = Batting average; HR = Home runs; RBI = Runs batted in

Other batters 
Note: G = Games played; AB = At bats; H = Hits; Avg. = Batting average; HR = Home runs; RBI = Runs batted in

Pitching

Starting pitchers 
Note: G = Games pitched; IP = Innings pitched; W = Wins; L = Losses; ERA = Earned run average; SO = Strikeouts

Other pitchers 
Note: G = Games pitched; IP = Innings pitched; W = Wins; L = Losses; ERA = Earned run average; SO = Strikeouts

Awards and honors

League top ten finishers 
Eddie Cicotte
 #2 in AL in ERA (1.78)

Joe Jackson
 #2 in AL in slugging percentage (.495)
 #3 in AL in batting average (.341)

References 

Chicago White Sox seasons
Chicago White Sox season
Chicago White